Nefudina qalibahensis is a rhenanid placoderm from the early Emsiane during the Early Devonian Epoch of Northeastern Saudi Arabia.  It is known from skull fragments and scales.it died out during the end of the emsiane.

References 
https://www.mindat.org/taxon-4842435.html

Rhenanida
Placoderms of Asia
Vertebrates of the Arabian Peninsula
Placoderm genera